Santa Sofia was a church on via Santa Sofia in the city of Naples, Italy, now deconsecrated.

It was founded around 308 by Constantine, though the present church was built in 1487 to house a congregation which worked to bury the poor. It has a 1754 maiolica pavement and its facade has two doors. It also contained paintings by Fabrizio Santafede and Marco Pino, but these were removed after the 1980 earthquake.

References

Former churches in Italy
Sofia